Hasan Abdulkareem Jabbar Sayyid (born 1 January 1999), also known as Qoqiah, is an Iraqi footballer who plays as a midfielder for Iraqi club Al-Zawraa and the Iraq national team.

Club career

Al-Shorta

Senior debut 
Abdulkareem was promoted from the Al-Shorta youth team to their first team in summer 2018. He made one start and six substitute appearances for the club in their 2018–19 Iraqi Premier League title-winning campaign.

Loans to Al-Karkh 
In Autumn 2019, Abdulkareem joined Al-Karkh on loan, before returning to his parent club Al-Shorta for the restarted 2019–20 season in February 2020, making one appearance. Abdulkareem joined Al-Karkh on loan again for the 2020–21 season, where he won Soccer Star's Young Player of the Season award.

Al-Karkh 
Abdulkareem joined Al-Karkh on a permanent basis ahead of the 2021–22 season.

International career 
Abdulkareem represented Iraq at under-19 and under-23 levels.

He made his senior debut on 30 November 2021, in the 2021 FIFA Arab Cup group-stage game against Oman. Having been substituted in the second half, he scored a penalty in stoppage time to help his team draw 1–1.

Career statistics

International 

Scores and results list Iraq's goal tally first, score column indicates score after each Abdulkareem goal.

Honours
Al-Shorta
 Iraqi Premier League: 2018–19

Al-Karkh
 Iraq FA Cup: 2021–22

Iraq
 Arabian Gulf Cup: 2023

References

External links

 
 
 

1999 births
Living people
Sportspeople from Baghdad
Iraqi footballers
Association football midfielders
Al-Shorta SC players
Al-Karkh SC players
Al-Zawraa SC players
Iraqi Premier League players
Iraq youth international footballers
Iraq international footballers